The 11th Division is an division of the Sri Lanka Army. Based at the Pallekele, it is responsible for the maintenance of capability for the defence of Kandy. It is also responsible for carrying out training and administrative work. It was established April 4, 1988, as 1st Division at the Panagoda Cantonment and was remanded the 11 Division in 1997.

Current formation 
 111 Brigade, Kandy
 112 Brigade
 113 Brigade

External links
11 DIV
Area Headquarters Kandy Becomes 111 Brigade Headquarters

Sri Lanka Army divisions
Military units and formations established in 1988